Lee Gong-Joo (born March 25, 1980) is a South Korean handball player who competed in the 2004 Summer Olympics.

In 2004, she won the silver medal with the South Korean team. She played six matches, including the final, and scored nine goals.

External links
Profile at databaseolympics.com (archived)

1980 births
Living people
South Korean female handball players
Olympic handball players of South Korea
Handball players at the 2004 Summer Olympics
Olympic silver medalists for South Korea
Olympic medalists in handball
Asian Games medalists in handball
Handball players at the 2006 Asian Games
Medalists at the 2004 Summer Olympics
Asian Games gold medalists for South Korea
Medalists at the 2006 Asian Games